Fung Tak-lun (born 9 August 1974), known professionally as Stephen Fung, is a Hong Kong actor, singer, writer, and film director.

Biography
Fung Tak-lun was born in Hong Kong and studied at German Swiss International School. He is a graduate of the University of Michigan.

Fung made his acting debut in Forbidden Nights (1990). Since then he has starred in more than 40 films and became a household name in China. In 2004, Fung wrote, directed, and starred in his feature film directorial debut, Enter the Phoenix, for Jackie Chan's newly formed company JCE Movies Limited; it became an instant hit. His second directing and starring feature, House of Fury, Fung's first collaboration with legendary action director Yuen Woo-ping, proved to be a success. House of Fury was the opening selection for the Hong Kong International Film Festival 2005, official selection for the 18th Tokyo International Film Festival, and the highest grossing Hong Kong film for the first half of 2005.

Besides continuing with his acting career, Fung directed Jump, written and produced by Stephen Chow for Sony Columbia Pictures Asia. In 2012, Fung directed the first two installments, Tai Chi 0 and Tai Chi Hero, in the "Taichi Trilogy."

Fung currently serves as executive producer, director and action director of the AMC original series Into the Badlands, which stars Daniel Wu, Nick Frost, Sarah Bolger, Marton Csokas. In 2017, The Adventurers, Fung's sixth film as director, was released. The movie stars Andy Lau, Jean Reno and Shu Qi.

Currently, Fung serves as executive producer and directed the first two episodes of Wu Assassins for Netflix.

Fung's production company Film Magic Pictures invested in the new company Cool Style, which was an entertainment company set up by Media Asia and Louis Koo's One Cool Group in 2021.  Cool Style's business scope includes artist management and related businesses aiming to cultivate new forces with abundant resources and platforms.

Personal life
Fung's mother, Julie Sek Yin (石燕), was a famous actress during Shaw Brothers' golden era of dramatic films during the 1960s.

Fung married Taiwanese actress Shu Qi in September 2016. The two met on the set of the gay romance drama Bishonen in 1997, and dated for four years before marrying.

Awards
Stockholm Film Festival, Best Director Bronze Horse Award Nomination
Hong Kong Film Awards, Best New Director Nomination 2005
Channel V China, Best New Director Award, 2009
Golden Melody Awards, Best Music Video Director Award, 2007

Filmography

Films

Actor
 Forbidden Nights (1990)
 Summer Snow (1995) 
 The Log (1996)
 He Comes from Planet K (1997) 
 First Love Unlimited (1997) 
 Cheap Killers (1998) 
 Bishonen (1998) 
 The Poet (1998) 
 Metade Fumaca (1999) 
 Gorgeous (1999) 
 Gen-X Cops (1999) 
 The Sunshine Cops (1999) 
 Dragon Heat (2000) 
 Twelve Nights (2000) 
 Un Baiser Volé (2000) 
 The Green Hope (TVB serial) (2000) 
 Bio-Cops (2000) 
 Gen-Y Cops (2000) 
 My Schoolmate the Barbarian (2001) 
 Healing Hearts (2001) 
 La Brassiere (2001) 
 Shadow (2001) 
 The Avenging Fist (2001) 
 2002 (2001) 
 Haunted Office (2002) 
 Women from Mars (2002) 
 The Irresistible Piggies (2002) 
 Devil Face, Angel Heart (2002) 
 Magic Kitchen (2004) 
 Enter the Phoenix (2004) 
 DragonBlade (2005) [voice only]
 House of Fury (2005) 
 49 Days (2006) 
 The Heavenly Kings (2006) 
 Heavenly Mission (2006)
 Agent J (2007)
 All About Women (2008)
 The Fantastic Water Babes (2010)
 Virtual Recall (2010)
 Lost in London (2012)
 Tai Chi 0 (2012)
 Tai Chi Hero (2012)
 Badges of Fury (2013)
 Amazing (2013)
 I Am Somebody (2015)

Writer
 Heroes in Love (2001) (My Beloved w/ Nicholas Tse)
 Enter the Phoenix (2004) 
 House of Fury (2005)
 Jump (2009)

Director
 Heroes in Love (My Beloved w/ Nicholas Tse)
 Enter the Phoenix (2004) 
 House of Fury (2005) 
 Jump (2009)
 Tai Chi 0 (2012)
 Tai Chi Hero (2012)
 The Adventurers (2017)

Producer
 Tai Chi 0 (2012)
 Tai Chi Hero (2012)
 Control (2013)

TV series

Actor
 The Green Hope (2000)
 Healing Hearts (2000)
 Stephen's Diary (2006)
 Day Breaker (2022)

Director
 Stephen's Diary (2006)
 Into the Badlands Season 2, Episodes 7, 8 (2017)
 Wu Assassins Season 1, Episodes 1, 2 (2019)

Writer
 Stephen's Diary (2006)

Executive producer
 Stephen's Diary (2006)
 Into the Badlands (2015)
 Wu Assassins (2019)

Action director
 Into the Badlands Season 1 (2015)
 Into the Badlands Season 3 (2017)

Discography

Solo
Ai Bu Gou/Love Not Enough (Album) (1999)

Track Listing:
 我走走走
 愛不夠
 愛我2000
 愛情肥皂劇
 偷看
 恨我還想你
 門
 別來煩我
 FALL IN LOVE
 問號

Gen-X Cops (Soundtrack) (1999)

Track Listing:
 YOU CAN'T STOP ME (Cantonese)
 XXXX
 非走不可 (Remix)
 LET ME BLEED
 CAN'T STOP ME (Mandarin)
 TERROR FROM SUNRISE (Instrumental)
 THE GEN-X RAVE (Instrumental)
 BAPTISM OF FIRE (Instrumental)
 THE FINAL JUMP (Instrumental)
 THE ERUPTION (Instrumental)

4 Green Hopes (EP) (2000)

Track Listing:
 新鮮人~ Green Hope
 新鮮人~ Luv Theme Whisper
 新鮮人~ Taylor Mix
 新鮮人~ Wah Wah Green Hope Mix

DRY

Contributions to other albums

References

External links
 

1974 births
Living people
Dry (group) members
Hong Kong male film actors
Hong Kong male television actors
Hong Kong film directors
Hong Kong film producers
Hong Kong screenwriters
20th-century Hong Kong male actors
21st-century Hong Kong male actors
University of Michigan alumni